Volviceramus is an extinct genus of fossil inoceramid bivalve mollusks from the Late Cretaceous of Europe and North America.

Species 
Species within the genus Volviceramus include:
 Volviceramus cardinalensis
 Volviceramus grandis
 Volviceramus stotti

References 

 Fossils (Smithsonian Handbooks) by David Ward (Page 98)

External links
Volviceramus in the Paleobiology Database

Inoceramidae
Cretaceous bivalves
Late Cretaceous molluscs
Prehistoric molluscs of Europe
Late Cretaceous animals of North America
Fossil taxa described in 1871
Prehistoric bivalves of North America